The 2010 Busan Open Challenger Tennis was a professional tennis tournament played on outdoor hard courts. It was part of the 2010 ATP Challenger Tour. It took place in Busan, South Korea between May 10 and May 16, 2010.

ATP entrants

Seeds

Rankings are as of May 3, 2010.

Other entrants
The following players received wildcards into the singles main draw:
  Lim Yong-Kyu
  Jun Woong-Sun
  Nam Ji Sung
  Jeong Suk-Young

The following players received entry from the qualifying draw:
  An Jae-Sung
  Chen Ti
  Hiroki Kondo ''(as a Lucky loser)
  Toshihide Matsui
  Sebastian Rieschick

Champions

Singles

 Lim Yong-Kyu def.  Lu Yen-hsun, 6–1, 6–4

Doubles

 Alexander Peya /  Rameez Junaid def.  Pierre-Ludovic Duclos /  Yang Tsung-hua, 6–4, 7–5

References
Official website
ITF search 

Busan Open Challenger
Busan
Busan Open
May 2010 sports events in South Korea